Galinsoga spellenbergii is a rare Mexican species of flowering plant in the family Asteraceae. It has been found only in the State of Durango in northern Mexico.

Description
Each head has about 5 white ray flowers surrounding a large number of yellow disc flowers.

References

spellenbergii
Flora of Durango
Plants described in 1986